Howard Le Chevalier Roome ( – April 1931) was an American football player.  He played halfback for Yale University championship teams of 1905 and 1906 and was selected by Walter Camp as a first-team All-American in 1905.  Roome graduated from Yale in 1907 and married amateur golfer Florence Newman Ayres in April 1909.  In May 1920, Roome won a $4,100 bet by climbing the 47 flights of stairs from the sub-cellar to the cupola of the Equitable Building in New York in 8 minutes, 52 seconds.  He later went into the real estate business and lived in Westbury, New York.  He died in April 1931.

References

1931 deaths
All-American college football players
Yale Bulldogs football players
Year of birth missing
People from Westbury, New York